Port-Royal Abbey was an abbey in Paris that was a stronghold of Jansenism. It was first built in 1626 to relieve pressure of numbers on the mother house at Port-Royal-des-Champs.

History
Famous people who stayed at the Port-Royal Abbey include Marie de Rohan, intriguer during the Fronde; Jeanne Baptiste d'Albert de Luynes, future mistress of a duke of Savoy; Marie Angélique de Fontanges, mistress of Louis XIV, died here giving birth to his child who also died.

It was closed down in 1790, at the beginning of the French Revolution and from 1793 used as a prison under the name Prison de Port-libre or Prison de la Bourbe. Chrétien Guillaume de Lamoignon de Malesherbes (lawyer for Louis XVI during his trial) and Madame de Tourzel, former governess of the "children of France", were held here.

Today its main cloister (illustration) forms part of the modern Hôpital Cochin.

Notable patrons 

Blaise Pascal
Jacqueline Pascal, sister of Blaise Pascal
Madame du Valois
Marc-Antoine Charpentier

Footnotes 

1626 establishments in France
Buildings and structures in Paris
Cistercian nunneries in France
Defunct prisons in Paris
Roman Catholic churches in the 14th arrondissement of Paris
Christian monasteries in Paris